The Tuscarora Reservation (Nyučirhéʼę in Tuscarora) is an Indian reservation in Niagara County, New York.  The population was 1,152 at the 2010 census. The Tuscarora are a federally recognized tribe and the Sixth Nation of the Haudenosaunee or Iroquois Confederacy active before the American Revolutionary War.

History 
The Tuscarora tribe had migrated in ancient times from the New York area to the South, where they were based in the Carolinas.  After an extended conflict with European settlers and other Native Americans at the beginning of the 18th century and defeat in the Tuscarora War, most of the tribe migrated North, beginning in 1722.

They first located in the territory of the Oneida tribe in central New York. By the early 1800s, they declared their tribe fully relocated and said that remnant Tuscarora who stayed in the South would no longer be considered part of the tribe.  The Tuscarora and Oneida became allies of the American Continental cause during the American Revolution, and of the United States during the War of 1812.  During both wars, they suffered attacks by British armed forces and their First Nations allies in central New York.  The Tuscarora were given land from the Seneca tribe (territory which they had taken from the Neutral Nation) in 1797).  In 1803, the US government granted the Tuscarora a reservation in Niagara County.

In 1960, through the efforts of the powerful appointed official, Robert Moses of New York City, New York State seized  of the Tuscarora reservation to form a reservoir for the Robert Moses Niagara Power Plant operated by the New York Power Authority. New York needed  but only received  and had to pay $1,500 per acre per a United States Supreme Court Decision. This led to a displacement of tribal members and a serious disruption to their economy.  After a lengthy court case and appeals, in 2003, the Power Authority agreed to compensate the tribe financially and return some unused land.

The reservation is a composite holding derived from (1) land given to the Seneca tribe, Land donated by the Holland Land Company, and (3) Trust territory held by the federal government.

Former University at Buffalo head football coach Frank Mount Pleasant was born here.

Geography
According to the United States Census Bureau, the Indian reservation has a total area of 9.3 mi2 (24.0 km2), all land.  The reservation is located northeast of Niagara Falls, New York. It is surrounded by the Town of Lewiston.

On October 26, 2019 it was reported that a Niagara Power Project, lost over 600 acres when Robert Moses flooded the land to create a reservoir. From that time on the Reservation experienced and continues to experience a water shortage with the reservation now sitting on top of the highest point in Niagara. " In 2012, 14 out of 15 wells tested positive for lead; 139 wells were tested for harmful bacteria and 69% tested positive for Total Coliforms, while 22% came back positive for E. coli."

Demographics

As of the census of 2000, there were 1,138 people, 398 households, and 284 families residing in the Indian reservation.  The population density was 122.8/mi2 (47.4/km2).  There were 398 housing units at an average density of 42.9/mi2 (16.6/km2).

There were 398 households, out of which 43.2% had children under the age of 18 living with them, 45.5% were married couples living together, 19.3% had a female householder with no husband present, and 28.4% were non-families. 21.1% of all households were made up of individuals, and 5.5% had someone living alone who was 65 years of age or older.  The average household size was 2.86 and the average family size was 3.36.

In the Indian reservation the population was spread out, with 34.3% under the age of 18, 13.7% from 18 to 24, 30.0% from 25 to 44, 14.3% from 45 to 64, and 7.7% who were 65 years of age or older.  The median age was 26 years. For every 100 females there were 104.7 males.  For every 100 females age 18 and over, there were 97.4 males.

The median income for a household in the Indian reservation was $32,500, and the median income for a family was $38,333. Males had a median income of $33,281 versus $25,074 for females. The per capita income for the Indian reservation was $14,427.  About 9.9% of families and 13.0% of the population were below the poverty line, including 13.4% of those under age 18 and 9.6% of those age 65 or over.

References

External links
  Tuscarora reservation land
  Early Tuscarora history

Lewiston (town), New York
American Indian reservations in New York (state)
Tuscarora
Geography of Niagara County, New York